Rani Mera Nam is a 1972 Indian Hindi-language masala film directed by K. S. R. Das. The film stars Vijayalalitha in lead role. Premnath, Ajit, Madan Puri are in supporting roles. Vinod Mehra, Ashok Kumar and Om Prakash have given special appearance. It is also Sridevi's Hindi debut film as a child artist. It is a remake of the 1970 Telugu film Rowdy Rani.

Plot

Cast 
Vijayalalitha as Rani
Premnath as John
Ajit as Amritlal
Madan Puri as Dayaram
Anwar Hussain as Zalim Singh
Iftekhar as Mangal
Jagdeep
Vinod Mehra as CID Inspector Anand (Special Appearance)
Ashok Kumar as IG (Special Appearance)
Om Prakash as Dhaniram (Special Appearance)
Sridevi as Young Rani

Soundtrack

References

External links 
 

1970s Hindi-language films
1970s masala films
1972 films
Films directed by K. S. R. Das
Films scored by R. D. Burman
Hindi remakes of Telugu films